Clairton Norchang Netto (born 28 February 1998) is a Brazilian professional footballer who plays as a forward for [[Clube do 
Remo]].

Professional career
A youth product of São Paulo FC, Netto was released in 2018 after a knee surgery, and signed with Internacional. Netto made his professional debut with Internacional in a 4-3 Campeonato Gaúcho win over São Luiz on 30 January 2020.

References

External links
 
 Internacional Profile

1998 births
Living people
Sportspeople from Minas Gerais
Brazilian footballers
Association football forwards
Sport Club Internacional players
Campeonato Brasileiro Série A players